Sergey Mikhnyuk (born 28 September 1983) is a Belarusian former professional footballer.

Honours
MTZ-RIPO Minsk
Belarusian Cup winner: 2004–05

References

External links 
 Profile at teams.by
 
 

1983 births
Living people
Belarusian footballers
Association football defenders
FC Dinamo Minsk players
FC Granit Mikashevichi players
FC Vitebsk players
FC Partizan Minsk players
FC Bereza-2010 players
FC SKVICH Minsk players